Neocollyris loochooensis is a species of ground beetle in the genus Neocollyris in the family Carabidae. It was described by Tadao Kano in 1929.

References

Loochooensis, Neocollyris
Beetles described in 1929